Stubtown is an unincorporated community in Pemiscot County, in the U.S. state of Missouri.

History
A variant name was "Game". A post office called Game was established in 1898, and remained in operation until 1911. The present name honors the local Stubbs family.

References

Unincorporated communities in Pemiscot County, Missouri
Unincorporated communities in Missouri